The qualifications for this list of Maine lakes is that the lake is located partially or entirely in Maine, named, and has a surface area of more than .  This makes it legally a great pond unless it is dammed, smaller than  prior to damming, smaller than  afterwards, and entirely bounded by land owned by a single landowner.  There are at least 2,677 lakes or ponds in Maine with no name (not including 2 whose name begins "Unnamed"), 222 of which would be on this list if named.  There are also at least 1,022 named lakes too small to make this list.

The lakes are organized by county, and from largest to smallest surface area in each county.  Some lakes are located in or border multiple counties; in these cases they are listed in the single county assigned to them in the primary reference for this list.  In some cases, alternative or former names of the lakes are given inside parentheses.  The list of adjoining towns is not always complete.

Androscoggin County

Aroostook County

Cumberland County

Franklin County

Hancock County

Kennebec County

Knox County

Lincoln County

Oxford County

Penobscot County

Piscataquis County

Sagadahoc County

Somerset County

Waldo County

Washington County

York County

See also

 List of rivers of Maine

References
 

Lakes
Maine